Haruna Salisu (born 1 June 1995) popularly known as Chizo_1_Germany or Chizo Germany, is a Nigerian-based German singer, comedian, actor, dancer, and social media influencer.

Early life 
Chizo Germany was born in Tudun Wada, Kaduna State, Nigeria, his parents later moved to Fagge in Kano State where he attended primary and Islamic schools. He later moved to Chandit Barrack to earn his Senior Secondary School Certificate (SSCE).

Career 
Chizo entered the entertainment industry as an actor and later began singing after he met with Kannywood star Adam A Zango. He made his debut song "Sarka Zancen Banza" with Adam A Zango which became a hit. Due to insurgency in Northern Nigeria Chizo Germany migrated to Niger Republic, Libya, Italy and finally settled in Germany. He produced many songs with his friend Bello Sisqo such as "Aisha", "Ifeoma", "Jarum" and "Abin".

Personal life
Chizo 1 Germany married Astrid Kemper, a German whom he met during his days at Tanzhaus NRW in April 2019.

References
 7. BBC interview Haruna salisu Chizo Dan ciranin daya shahara a tura https://www.bbc.com/hausa/media-55865510.amp

External links
 Official website 
 Instagram Handle

1995 births
Nigerian male film actors
Living people
People from Kaduna
Male actors in Hausa cinema
21st-century Nigerian male actors
21st-century Nigerian male singers
Nigerian male television actors
Nigerian male comedians
Nigerian male dancers
Nigerian Internet celebrities